The Seven Sisters of India: Tribal Worlds Between Tibet and Burma is a book by Aglaja Stirn and Peter Van Ham and was published by Prestel Publishing in 2001. The book is the first comprehensive publication on India's remote northeast starting from Tibet in the north to Myanmar (Burma) in the south and in between the North eastern states of India. This is an area where people continue a way of life steeped in ancient ritual which is scarcely known to the western world and hence rarely visited by foreigners. The book explains and illustrates the various aspects of these cultures with numerous high-quality color photographs.

The book contains individual chapters covering matriarchal tribal structure, daily life, religious rituals and fertility rites, varied geographies, ancestor worship, sun and moon cults, the arts of weaving and dance, and the headhunting practices that prevailed in this region 50 years ago.

References

External links
Book review on Barnesandnoble
Book review on Amazon.co.uk

2000 non-fiction books
Indian non-fiction books
Assamese literature
Books from Assam
Headhunting accounts and studies
Ethnographic literature
21st-century Indian books
Prestel Publishing books